Stenygra is a genus of beetles in the family Cerambycidae, containing the following species:

 Stenygra angustata (Olivier, 1790)
 Stenygra apicalis Gounelle, 1911
 Stenygra brevispinea Delfino, 1985
 Stenygra conspicua (Perty, 1832)
 Stenygra contracta Pascoe, 1862
 Stenygra cosmocera White, 1855
 Stenygra euryarthron Delfino, 1985
 Stenygra globicollis Kirsch, 1889
 Stenygra histrio Audinet-Serville, 1834
 Stenygra holmgreni Aurivillius, 1908
 Stenygra seabrai Delfino, 1985
 Stenygra setigera (Germar, 1824)

References

Ibidionini